The Looking-Glass is a 1943 novel by William March.  A continuation of his "Pearl County" series of novels and short stories, it is considered by many to be his greatest work. Originally titled Kneel to the Prettiest. The first two novels in the series are Come in at the Door and The Tallons.

Plot summary
Set in the mythical town of Reedyville, Alabama, The Looking-Glass is a mosaic of multiple character stories and histories, interwoven in a non-linear fashion. It has been described as akin to the Spoon River style of storytelling with its multiple character studies.

Editions
1943, USA, Little, Brown and Company, Pub date 6 January 1943, hardback
1944, UK, Victor Gollancz Limited, Pub date 26 June 1944, hardback
1953, USA, Bantam Books, Pub date February 1953, hardback
1955, USA, Popular Library, Pub date 1955, paperback
2015, USA, University of Alabama Press, Pub date 2015, paperback

1943 American novels
Novels by William March
Novels set in Alabama
Nonlinear narrative novels
Little, Brown and Company books